The Adjutant General of Nevada is the senior officer of the Nevada National Guard overseeing command of more than 4,000 Nevada Army and Air National Guard personnel and responsible for both the federal and state missions of the Nevada National Guard. The adjutant general is appointed by the governor of Nevada.

History 
The position of adjutant general in Nevada was created following the state's Organic Act in 1861. In accordance with federal law, the Territorial Legislature defined the "enrolled" militia as "every free, able-bodied white male inhabitant...between the ages of eighteen and forty-five years" except those exempted by law. Similar legislation was established following Nevada's entrance into statehood in 1864. Under Nevada law, the adjutant general serves as the senior military officer. Throughout the state's first century, though, the obligations were ex-officio positions of other offices, including lieutenant governor and secretary of state. In 1948, the Nevada National Guard re-organized after it federalized for service in World War II. This new force included both the Nevada Army National Guard and the emergence of the Nevada Air National Guard. In 1967, Nevada changed its militia law to create a full-time adjutant general position in the state. Since 2002, the adjutant general has worked out of the Office of the Adjutant General in Carson City, Nev.

List of Nevada adjutants general

References 

Military in Nevada
Adjutants general of the National Guard of the United States